Christine Hiebert (born 1960) is a Swiss-born American artist known for her drawing. Her work is included in the collections of the Whitney Museum of American Art and the Metropolitan Museum of Art. She was raised in Pennsylvania and was educated at the University of the Arts.

References

External links
Official website

1960 births
Living people
20th-century American women artists
20th-century American artists
Swiss artists
Swiss women artists
21st-century American women